Robert A. Hurwitch (October 15, 1920 – July 16, 1997) was an American diplomat who served as the United States Ambassador to the Dominican Republic from 1973 to 1978.

In 1979, Hurwitch pleaded guilty to "illegally using about $17,000 worth of embassy labor and supplies to build a swimming pool and prepare a retirement home for himself outside Santo Domingo." He was sentenced to two years' unsupervised probation.

Hurwitch graduated from the University of Chicago.  He died of lung cancer on July 16, 1997, in Scituate, Massachusetts at age 76.

References

1920 births
1997 deaths
Ambassadors of the United States to the Dominican Republic
People from Worcester, Massachusetts
University of Chicago alumni
Deaths from lung cancer in Massachusetts
American politicians convicted of crimes